In Greek mythology, Phrontis (/fron-tis/; Ancient Greek: Φροντις) or Phrontides was one of four (or five) sons of Phrixus and Chalciope (Iophassa), daughter of King Aeetes of Colchis. His brothers were Cytissorus, Argus and Melas, and according to some accounts, also of Presbon.

Mythology 
Phrontis and his brothers were raised in Colchis, but after their father died, he and his brothers set out to avenge their father’s ill treatment at the hands of king Athamas of Orchomenus; they were stranded on the Island of Ares (Dia) in the Black Sea until they were rescued from the island by Jason and the Argonauts. Once Jason discovered that Phrontis and his brothers were grandsons of King Aeëtes of Colchis, Jason convinced Phrontis and his brothers to return with him to Colchis and help him to obtain the Golden Fleece. Jason also questioned Phrontis and his brothers on the layout and security of the land. After the Fleece was retrieved from Colchis, Phrontis and his brothers returned with the Argo's crew to Greece.

Notes

References 
 Gaius Julius Hyginus, Fabulae from The Myths of Hyginus translated and edited by Mary Grant. University of Kansas Publications in Humanistic Studies. Online version at the Topos Text Project.
 Gaius Valerius Flaccus, Argonautica translated by Mozley, J H. Loeb Classical Library Volume 286. Cambridge, MA, Harvard University Press; London, William Heinemann Ltd. 1928. Online version at theio.com.
 Gaius Valerius Flaccus, Argonauticon. Otto Kramer. Leipzig. Teubner. 1913. Latin text available at the Perseus Digital Library.
 Hesiod, Catalogue of Women from Homeric Hymns, Epic Cycle, Homerica translated by Evelyn-White, H G. Loeb Classical Library Volume 57. London: William Heinemann, 1914. Online version at theio.com
Pausanias, Description of Greece with an English Translation by W.H.S. Jones, Litt.D., and H.A. Ormerod, M.A., in 4 Volumes. Cambridge, MA, Harvard University Press; London, William Heinemann Ltd. 1918. . Online version at the Perseus Digital Library
Pausanias, Graeciae Descriptio. 3 vols. Leipzig, Teubner. 1903.  Greek text available at the Perseus Digital Library.
Pseudo-Apollodorus, The Library with an English Translation by Sir James George Frazer, F.B.A., F.R.S. in 2 Volumes, Cambridge, MA, Harvard University Press; London, William Heinemann Ltd. 1921. . Online version at the Perseus Digital Library. Greek text available from the same website.
 Argonauts

Boeotian characters in Greek mythology